"Eat the rich" is a political slogan associated with anti-capitalism and far-left politics. It may variously be used as a metaphor for class conflict, a demand for wealth redistribution, or a literal call to violence.  The phrase is commonly attributed to political philosopher Jean-Jacques Rousseau, from a quote first popularized during the French Revolution: "When the people shall have nothing more to eat, they will eat the rich".

History

Origin 
Pierre Gaspard Chaumette, President of the Paris Commune, gave a speech to the city during the Reign of Terror on 14 October 1793 in which he said:
The phrase was initially a criticism of the French nobility, but it was later popularized in France as a response to the perceived failures of the French Revolution that perpetuated poverty in the country.

Modern usage 
In the 21st century, the phrase is used in response to the increasing wealth inequality and food insecurity. In the United States, the phrase was used by the crowd at a rally for progressive Democratic candidate Elizabeth Warren in 2019 in approval of Warren's positions on wealth redistribution, including her position on the wealth tax.

In South Africa, the phrase "eat the rich" was used by the Land Party as its campaign slogan for the 2021 local government elections.

The phrase has trended on major social networks online. It became prominent on TikTok in the late 2010s, with users posting videos critical of the rich. Many of these videos also targeted more mundane first world behavior, directing the phrase toward people that study abroad, pay for a Spotify subscription, or have a second refrigerator. In many cases, these videos were produced to demonstrate hypocrisy of those that use the phrase while enjoying the comforts of a first world society. Usage of the phrase was noted to have increased following the COVID-19 lockdowns in 2020.

In popular culture 
The phrase has been used for the title of a 1987 film and a song for the film by Motörhead. It was also the title of a 1993 song by Aerosmith. The book Eat the Rich was published by P. J. O'Rourke in 1998. The comic series Eat the Rich debuted in 2021.

Many films have been described as "eat the rich movies". This theme was particularly notable in 2019 with the releases of films such as Joker, Parasite, Knives Out, and Ready or Not and in 2022 with the releases of Triangle of Sadness, The Menu, and Glass Onion: A Knives Out Mystery.

Season 4 (2023) of the TV show You features an 'Eat the Rich killer'.

Criticism 
Rhetoric targeting the rich is criticized for being prejudicial, perpetuating stereotypes, and engaging in classism. It can also serve to dehumanize people wealthier than the speaker and poses risks of inciting violence. Left-wing critics of the term argue that it's used hypocritically by those in the middle class that relatively comfortable lives. In 2020, Kim Kardashian criticized the movement on Twitter, arguing that the rich are not compelled to disclose every philanthropic donation they make simply to avoid criticism.

Wealth taxes, a common meaning for "eat the rich", are criticized as being impractical or counterproductive due to fears of capital flight, the process of valuation, ethical concerns, and what critics say is a poor track record of success. Those in favor of "eat the rich" politics are also accused of falsely claiming that billionaires have the ability to end world hunger.

The concept of "eat the rich" has also been found to bias jurors against defendants charged with white-collar crimes, even if the defendant is not wealthy or if the evidence exonerates the defendant.

See also
No War but the Class War

References

Works cited

 

Anti-capitalism
Slogans
Jean-Jacques Rousseau